William Joseph Raymond (born September 9, 1938) is an American actor who has appeared in film, television, theater and radio drama since the 1960s.

Career
He is featured in the second and fifth seasons of the HBO drama The Wire as "The Greek", the mysterious head of an international criminal organization. Other TV appearances include Miami Vice, Law & Order, Third Watch, Ed and As the World Turns.

Raymond co-stars as Dr. Carroll on The Cobblestone Corridor, premiering on October 16 on CPTV.

In 2015, Raymond played Grand Albert in the kids TV show, Super Wings.

Film
His film credits include Eight Men Out, Michael Clayton, C.H.U.D., The Crow, Quick Change, How I Got into College, My New Gun, 12 Monkeys, and Dogville.

Raymond played Speaker of the United States House of Representatives Schuyler Colfax in Steven Spielberg's Lincoln. in 2014, he played the lead role in the ghost film Foreclosure, opposite Michael Imperioli.  He appeared in seven of Vermont filmmaker, Jay Craven's indie films, including "Where the Rivers Flow North," "A Stranger in the Kingdom," "In Jest," "The Year That Trembled," "Windy Acres," "Disappearances," and "Peter and John."

Theater
Raymond was an active member and co-artistic director of the experimental theater group Mabou Mines in the 1970s and 1980s.

He played Ebenezer Scrooge in the Hartford Stage production of Charles Dickens' A Christmas Carol for 17 of its first 19 years, retiring from the role in 2016.

Raymond was also active in the early days of the R.G. Davis Mime Troupe in San Francisco in the 1960s.

Radio
Raymond has played the character T.J. Teru, archeologist on Summa Nulla, in all 13 chapters of the ZBS Foundation's audio series, Ruby the Galactic Gumshoe, produced from 1982 to 2018. Raymond has appeared in other ZBS productions as well, including Saratoga Springs, Saratoga Fat Cats, Do That in Real Life? and the audio adaptation of Dinotopia.

Filmography

Film

Television

References

External links
 

American male stage actors
Male actors from San Francisco
1938 births
American male film actors
Living people
American male television actors
ZBS Foundation